Tukiki and His Search for a Merry Christmas is a 1979 animated Christmas television special produced by the Canadian-based Atkinson Film-Arts. It was originally broadcast on CBC and in syndication on December 24, 1979.

Plot
Tukiki (voiced by Adam Rich) is a small Eskimo boy who sets out to discover the meaning of Christmas along with a magical character known as North Wind (voiced by Sterling Holloway). While on his journey, Tukiki visits different lands with varying cultures and customs. At each of these places, he learns something  different about Christmas and is given gifts which he eventually takes back to give to his selfish arctic friends. The thoughtful giving of gifts brings about a change in Tukiki's homeland and suddenly harmony reigns where once was none, and through Tukiki's act of love, the true meaning of Christmas is discovered.

Cast
The voice cast included:

Principal characters
 Adam Rich – Tukiki
 Sterling Holloway – North Wind

Other voices
 Sharon Burke
 Bob Dermer
 Fred Little
 Bill Luxton
 Bernard McManus
 Richard Perigrine
 Noreen Young

Award nominations
1980 Genie Awards:
 Outstanding Independent Film - W.H. Stevens Jr., Beryl Friesen
 Outstanding Animation - W.H. Stevens Jr., Beryl Friesen
 Outstanding Musical Score (Non-Feature) - Hagood Hardy

Home media
Tukiki and His Search for a Merry Christmas was released on VHS by Embassy Home Entertainment in 1986 which has long been out of print. On August 12, 2008, it was released as a manufacture-on-demand DVD-R as part of the "Holiday Classics" series by Phoenix Learning Group, Inc.

See also
List of Christmas films

References

External links

1979 television specials
Animated television specials
Canadian animated television films
Canadian Christmas films
Canadian television specials
Christmas television specials
CBC Television original films